Battle Creek is a city in the U.S. state of Michigan.

Battle Creek may also refer to:

Cities
Battle Creek, Iowa
Battle Creek, Michigan
Battle Creek, Nebraska
Battle Creek, Utah, the original name of Pleasant Grove, Utah

Streams
Battle Creek (Milk River tributary) in Canada and north-central United States
Battle Creek River in Michigan
Battle Creek (California) 
Battle Creek (Maple River), a river in Ida County, Iowa
Battle Creek (Minnesota)
Battle Creek (Owyhee River), Idaho
Battle Creek (Nebraska)
Battle Creek (Evans Creek tributary), a stream in Oregon
Battle Creek (Butte County, South Dakota)
Battle Creek (Cheyenne River), a stream in South Dakota
Battle Creek (Lake Campbell), a stream in South Dakota

Other
Battle Creek (Amtrak station)
Battle Creek (TV series), American television series on CBS
Battle Creek Cypress Swamp, Maryland
Battle Creek massacre
Battle Creek Sanitarium, in Battle Creek, Michigan
Battlecreek,  a 2017 film directed by Alison Eastwood

See also
 Battle (disambiguation)
 Battle River (disambiguation)
 Battle Lake (disambiguation)